Peñas de San Pedro is a municipality in Albacete, Castile-La Mancha, Spain.

Peñas de San Pedro is 66.41 sq miles (172 km²) located south of CM-313 and west of CM-3203. It has a population of 1,405 (2014). It has an average altitude of 1.015 meters or 0.0006 miles above sea level.

This place in Spain was once home to the Castle of San Pedro Peñas, which is now demolished. Many people considered this castle to be very strong and impenetrable.

This is a very religious place with a parish church honoring Lady of La Esperanza as well as a temple in baroque style. This settlement is also home to the sanctuary of Christ Crucified Sahuco.

References 

Municipalities of the Province of Albacete